Sylvia Pantel (born 1 January 1961) is a German politician of the Christian Democratic Union (CDU) who was a member of the Bundestag from the state of North Rhine-Westphalia from 2013 to 2021.

Political career 
Pantel first became member of the Bundestag in the 2013 German federal election, representing the Düsseldorf II district. She is a member of the Committee on Families, Senior Citizens, Women and Youth.

She lost her seat in the 2021 German federal election.

Political positions 
Ahead of the 2021 Christian Democratic Union of Germany leadership election, Pantel publicly endorsed Friedrich Merz to succeed Annegret Kramp-Karrenbauer as the party’s chair.

See also 
 List of members of the 18th Bundestag
 List of members of the 19th Bundestag

References

External links 

  
 Bundestag biography 

1961 births
Living people
Members of the Bundestag for North Rhine-Westphalia
Female members of the Bundestag
21st-century German women politicians
Members of the Bundestag 2017–2021
Members of the Bundestag 2013–2017
Members of the Bundestag for the Christian Democratic Union of Germany